Bačinci is a village located in Syrmia, Vojvodina, Serbia. It is situated in the Šid municipality, in the Syrmia District. The village has a Serb ethnic majority and its population numbering 1,180 people (2011 census).

Name
The name of the village in Serbian is plural.

Historical population

1961: 1,694
1971: 1,538
1981: 1,324
1991: 1,298
2002: 1,374

References
Slobodan Ćurčić, Broj stanovnika Vojvodine, Novi Sad, 1996.

See also
 List of places in Serbia
 List of cities, towns and villages in Vojvodina
 Church of St. Nicholas, Bačinci

Populated places in Syrmia